Peter Grace is an Australian production sound mixer. He is best known for his work on critically acclaimed war-drama film Hacksaw Ridge (2016) for which he received the Academy Award for Best Sound Mixing at the 89th Academy Awards, sharing with Robert Mackenzie, Kevin O'Connell and Andy Wright.

Accolades
 Academy Award for Best Sound Mixing – Hacksaw Ridge (won)
 AACTA Award for Best Sound – Hacksaw Ridge (won)
 BAFTA Award for Best Sound – Hacksaw Ridge (nominated)
 Cinema Audio Society Award for Outstanding Achievement in Sound Mixing for a Motion Picture – Live Action – Hacksaw Ridge (nominated)
 Satellite Award for Best Sound – Hacksaw Ridge (won)

References

External links
 

Living people
Australian audio engineers
Year of birth missing (living people)
Australian film people
Best Sound Mixing Academy Award winners